Conrad II may refer to:

Conrad II, Duke of Transjurane Burgundy
Conrad II, Holy Roman Emperor (c. 990–1039)
Conrad II, Duke of Carinthia (probably 1003–1039)
Conrad II of Italy (1074–1101)
Conrad II of Dachau (died 1159)
Conrad II of Znojmo (died 1161)
Conrad II of Bohemia (died 1191)
Conrad II, Margrave of Lusatia (before 1159–1210)
Conrad II (bishop of Hildesheim) (late 12th century–1249)
Conrad II of Jerusalem (1228–1254)
Conrad II of Teck (1235–1292)
Conrad II the Hunchback (1252/65–1304)
Konrad II the Gray (ca. 1340–1403)